James Gordon Edwards (June 24, 1867 – December 31, 1925) was a Canadian-born film director, producer, and writer who began his career as a stage actor and stage director.

Biography
James Gordon Edwards was born in Montreal in 1867 to parents of Scotch-French ancestry. He made his directorial debut with the 1914 film St. Elmo.

Edwards went on directing all of the Fox Film Corporation's mega-budget spectacles, including all of actress Theda Bara's productions between 1916 and 1919. Later, he became the production supervisor at Fox, and continued to direct until he died in 1925. One of his biggest projects was The Queen of Sheba (1921), a lost silent film which contained a huge chariot race, four years before Ben-Hur (1925). Essentially all of his films (other than a few low quality prints) for Fox Studios were lost in the 1937 Fox vault fire, which claimed 75% of all Fox films made before 1930. He was the stepgrandfather of director Blake Edwards.

He was married to actress Angela McCaull, daughter of opera impresario John A. McCaull. Edwards died of pneumonia at age 58 in New York City. His widow later commissioned a mausoleum in his honor at Kensico Cemetery, where both of their ashes reside.

Filmography

Production supervisor
 A Daughter of the Gods (1916) - lost

Director

 St. Elmo (1914) - lost
Life's Shop Window (1914) - lost
A Woman's Resurrection (1915) - lost
Anna Karenina (1915) - lost
Should a Mother Tell (1915) - lost
The Song of Hate (1915) - lost
The Blindness of Devotion (1915) - lost
The Unfaithful Wife (1915) - lost
The Galley Slave (1915) - lost
Under Two Flags (1916) - lost
Her Double Life (1916) - lost
A Wife's Sacrifice (1916) - lost
The Vixen (1916) - lost
The Green-Eyed Monster (1916) - lost
Romeo and Juliet (1916) - lost
The Spider and the Fly (1916) - lost
The Tiger Woman (1917) - lost
Tangled Lives (1917) - lost
Her Greatest Love (1917) - lost
The Rose of Blood (1917) - lost
Madame Du Barry (1917) - lostHeart and Soul (1917) - lostThe Darling of Paris (1917) - lostCleopatra (1917) - lostCamille (1917) - lostWhen a Woman Sins (1918) - lostUnder the Yoke (1918) - lostThe Soul of Buddha (1918) - lostThe She Devil (1918) - lostSalome (1918) - lostThe Forbidden Path (1918) - lostA Woman There Was (1919) - lostWolves of the Night (1919) - lostWings of the Morning (1919) - lostWhen Men Desire (1919) - lostThe Siren's Song (1919) - lostThe Lone Star Ranger (1919) - lostThe Light (1919) - lostThe Last of the Duanes (1919) - lostThe Orphan (1920) - lostHeart Strings (1920) - lostIf I Were King (1920)Drag Harlan (1920)The Adventurer (1920) - lostThe Joyous Troublemaker (1920) - lostThe Scuttlers (1920) - lostThe Queen of Sheba (1921) - lostHis Greatest Sacrifice (1921)Nero (1922) - lostThe Silent Command (1923)The Net - lostIt Is the Law (1924) - lost

Writer
 The Queen of Sheba (1921) - lost
 A Wife's Sacrifice (1916) - lost
 The Blindness of Devotion'' (1915) - lost

References

External links

 
1867 births
1925 deaths
Burials at Kensico Cemetery
Canadian emigrants to the United States
Film directors from Montreal
Writers from Montreal
Deaths from pneumonia in New York City